Jiayuguan South railway station is a railway station located in Jiayuguan, Gansu Province, China. It was put into operation on December 26, 2014. It serves the Lanzhou–Xinjiang High-Speed Railway with High Speed services between Lanzhou and Urumqi and conventional services connecting Urumqi to various cities in Eastern and South Western China. It is the second major railway station serving Jiayuguan, with Jiayuguan railway station, which serves the conventional Lanzhou-Xinjiang Railway.

Structure
The station follows a standard set for modern railway station in China for smaller cities. It was constructed on a green field site, south of Jiayuguan, in an area being newly developed. It is built across three levels, the upper platform level, the mid level passenger waiting hall (located north of the tracks) and the lower transportation hub. It consists of 7 tracks served by 5 platforms, two island and one side platforms. Platform 1 serves all terminating high speed trains to and from Lanzhou. Platforms 2 & 3 serves eastbound through train services, two through passing tracks and then with platforms 4 & 5 serving westbound services.

Gallery

References

Railway stations in Gansu
Railway stations in China opened in 2014